The politics of climate change results from different perspectives on how to respond to climate change. Global warming is driven largely by the emissions of greenhouse gases due to human economic activity, especially the burning of fossil fuels, certain industries like cement and steel production, and land use for agriculture and forestry. Since the Industrial Revolution, fossil fuels have provided the main source of energy for economic and technological development. The centrality of fossil fuels and other carbon-intensive industries has resulted in much resistance to climate friendly policy, despite widespread scientific consensus that such policy is necessary.

Climate change first emerged as a political issue in the 1970s. Efforts to mitigate climate change have been prominent on the international political agenda since the 1990s, and are also increasingly addressed at national and local level. Climate change is a complex global problem. Greenhouse gas (GHG) emissions contribute to global warming across the world, regardless of where the emissions originate. Yet the impact of global warming varies widely depending on how vulnerable a location or economy is to its effects. Global warming is on the whole having negative impact, which is predicted to worsen as heating increases. Ability to benefit from both fossil fuels and renewable energy sources vary substantially from nation to nation.

Different responsibilities, benefits and climate related threats faced by the world's nations contributed to early climate change conferences producing little beyond general statements of intent to address the problem, and non-binding commitments from the developed countries to reduce emissions. In the 21st century, there has been increased attention to mechanisms like climate finance in order for vulnerable nations to adapt to climate change. In some nations and local jurisdictions, climate friendly policies have been adopted that go well beyond what was committed to at international level. Yet local reductions in GHG emission that such policies achieve will not slow global warming unless the overall volume of GHG emission declines across the planet.

Since entering the 2020s, the feasibility of replacing energy from fossil fuel with renewable energy sources significantly increased, with some countries now generating almost all their electricity from renewables. Public awareness of the climate change threat has risen, in larger part due to social movement led by youth and visibility of the impacts of climate change, such as extreme weather events and flooding caused by sea level rise. Many surveys show a growing proportion of voters support tackling climate change as a high priority, making it easier for politicians to commit to policies that include climate action. The COVID-19 pandemic and economic recession lead to widespread calls for a "green recovery", with some political contexts like the European Union successfully integrating climate action into policy change. Outright climate change denial had become a much less influential force by 2019, where opposition has pivoted to strategies of encouraging delay or inaction.

Policy debate
Like all policy debates, the political debate on climate change is fundamentally about action. Various distinct arguments underpin the politics of climate change - such as different assessments of the urgency of the threat, and on the feasibility, advantages and disadvantages of various responses. But essentially, these all relate to potential responses to climate change. 

The statements that form political arguments can be divided into two types: positive and normative statements. Positive statements can generally be clarified or refuted by careful definition of terms, and scientific evidence. Whereas normative statements about what one "ought" to do often relate at least partly to morality, and are essentially a matter of judgement. Experience has indicated that better progress is often made at debates if participants attempt to disentangle the positive and normative parts of their arguments, reaching agreement on the positive statements first. In the early stages of a debate, the normative positions of participants can be strongly influenced by perceptions of the best interests of whatever constituency they represent. In achieving exceptional progress at the 2015 Paris conference, Christiana Figueres and others noted it was helpful that key participants were able to move beyond a competitive mindset concerning competing interests, to normative statements that reflected a shared abundance based collaborative mindset.

Actions in response to climate change can be divided into three classes: mitigation – actions to reduce greenhouse gas emissions and to enhance carbon sinks, adaptation – actions to defend against the negative results of global warming, and solar radiation management (a type of climate engineering) – a technology in which sunlight (solar radiation) would be reflected back to outer space.

Most 20th century international debate on climate change focused almost entirely on mitigation. It was sometimes considered defeatist to pay much attention to adaptation. Also, compared to mitigation, adaptation is more a local matter, with different parts of the world facing vastly different threats and opportunities from climate change. By the early 21st century, while mitigation still receives most attention in political debates, it is no longer the sole focus. Some degree of adaptation is now widely considered essential, and is discussed internationally at least at high level, though which specific actions to take remain mostly a local matter. A commitment to provide $100 billion per year worth of funding to developing countries was made at the 2009 Copenhagen Summit. At Paris, it was clarified that allocation of the funding should involve a balanced split between adaptation and mitigation, though , not all funding had been provided, and what had been delivered was going mainly to mitigation projects. By 2019, possibilities for geoengineering were also increasingly being discussed, and were expected to become more prominent in future debates.

Political debate concerning which specific courses of action for achieving effective mitigation tends to vary depending on the scale of governance concerned. Different considerations apply for international debate, compared with national and municipal level discussion. In the 1990s, when climate change first became prominent on the political agenda, there was optimism that the problem could be successfully tackled. The then recent signing of the 1987 Montreal Protocol to protect the ozone layer had indicated that the world was able to act collectively to address a threat warned about by scientists, even when it was not yet causing significant harm to humans. Yet by the early 2000s, GHG emissions had continued to rise, with little sign of agreement to penalise emitters or reward climate friendly behaviour. It had become clear that achieving global agreement for effective action to limit global warming would be much more challenging. Some politicians, such as Arnold Schwarzenegger with his slogan "terminate pollution", say that activists should generate optimism by focusing on the health co-benefits of climate action.

Multilateral

Climate change became a fixture on the global political agenda in the early 1990s, with United Nations Climate Change conferences set to run yearly. These annual events are also called Conferences of the Parties (COPs). Major landmark COPs were the 1997 Kyoto Protocol, the 2009 Copenhagen Summit and the 2015 Paris conference. Kyoto was initially considered promising, yet by the early 2000s its results had proved disappointing. Copenhagen saw a major attempt to move beyond Kyoto with a much stronger package of commitments, yet largely failed. Paris was widely considered successful, yet how effective it will be at reducing long term global warming remains to be seen.

At international level, there are three broad approaches to emissions reduction that nations can attempt to negotiate. Firstly, the adoption of emissions reductions targets. Secondly, setting a carbon price. Lastly, creating largely voluntary set of processes to encourage emission reduction, which include the sharing of information and progress reviews. These approaches are largely complementary, though at various conferences much of the focus has often been on a single approach.
Until about 2010, international negotiations focused largely on emissions targets. The success of the Montreal treaty in reducing emissions that damaged the ozone layer suggested that targets could be effective. Yet in the case of greenhouse gas reductions, targets have not in general led to substantial cuts in emissions. Ambitious targets have usually not been met. Attempts to impose severe penalties that would incentivise more determined efforts to meet challenging targets, have always been blocked by at least one or two nations.

In the 21st century, there is widespread agreement that a carbon price is the most effective way to reduce emissions, at least in theory. Generally though, nations have been reluctant to adopt a high carbon price, or in most cases any price at all. One of the main reasons for this reluctance is the problem of carbon leakage – the phenomena where activities producing GHG emissions are moved out of the jurisdiction that imposes the carbon price thus depriving the jurisdiction of jobs & revenue, and to no benefit, as the emissions will be released elsewhere. Nonetheless, the percentage of the worlds' emissions that are covered by a carbon price rose from 5% in 2005, to 15% by 2019, and should reach over 40% once China's carbon price comes fully into force. Existing carbon price regimes have been implemented mostly independently by the European Union, nations and sub national jurisdictions acting autonomously.

The largely voluntary pledge and review system where states make their own plans for emissions reduction was introduced in 1991, but abandoned before the 1997 Kyoto treaty, where the focus was on securing agreement for "top down" emissions targets. The approach was revived at Copenhagen, and gained further prominence with the 2015 Paris Agreement, though pledges came to be called nationally determined contributions (NDCs). These are meant to be re-submitted in enhanced form every 5 years. How effective this approach is remains to be seen. Some countries submitted elevated NDCs in 2021, around the time of the Glasgow conference. Accounting rules for carbon trading were agreed at the 2021 Glasgow COP meeting.

Regional, National and sub national

Policies to reduce GHG emissions are set by either national or sub national jurisdictions, or at regional level in the case of the European Union. Much of the emission reduction policies that have been put into place have been beyond those required by international agreements. Examples include the introduction of a carbon price by some individual US states, or Costa Rica reaching 99% electrical power generation by renewables in the 2010s.

Actual decisions to reduce emissions or deploy clean technologies are mostly not made by governments themselves, but by individuals, businesses and other organisations. Yet it is national and local governments that set policies to encourage climate friendly activity. Broadly these policies can be divided into four types: firstly, the implementation of a carbon price mechanism and other financial incentives; secondly prescriptive regulations, for example mandating that a certain percentage of electricity generation must be from renewables; thirdly, direct government spending on climate friendly activity or research; and fourthly, approaches based on information sharing, education and encouraging voluntary climate friendly behaviour. Local politics is sometimes combined with air pollution, for example the politics of creating low emission zones in cities may also aim to reduce carbon emissions from road transport.

Non-governmental actors
Individuals, businesses and NGOs can affect the politics of climate change both directly and indirectly. Mechanisms include individual rhetoric, aggregate expression of opinion by means of polls, and mass protests. Historically, a significant proportion of these protests have been against climate friendly policies. Since the 2000 UK fuel protests there have been dozens of protests across the world against fuel taxes or the ending of fuel subsidies. Since 2019 and the advent of the school strike and Extinction Rebellion, pro climate protests have become more prominent. Indirect channels for apolitical actors to effect the politics of climate change include funding or working on green technologies, and the fossil fuel divestment movement.

Special interests and lobbying by non-country actors

There are numerous special interest groups, organizations, and corporations who have public and private positions on the multifaceted topic of global warming. The following is a partial list of the types of special interest parties that have shown an interest in the politics of global warming:
 Fossil fuel companies: Traditional fossil fuel corporations stand to lose from stricter global warming regulations, though there are exceptions. The fact fossil fuel companies are engaged in energy trading might mean that their participation in trading schemes and other such mechanisms could give them a unique advantage, so it is unclear whether every traditional fossil fuel companies would always be against stricter global warming policies. As an example, Enron, a traditional gas pipeline company with a large trading desk heavily lobbied the United States government to regulate : they thought that they would dominate the energy industry if they could be at the center of energy trading. 
 Farmers and agribusiness are an important lobby but vary in their views on effects of climate change on agriculture and greenhouse gas emissions from agriculture and, for example, the role of the EU Common Agricultural Policy.
 Financial Institutions: Financial institutions generally support policies against global warming, particularly the implementation of carbon trading schemes and the creation of market mechanisms that associate a price with carbon. These new markets require trading infrastructures, which banking institutions can provide. Financial institutions are also well positioned to invest, trade and develop various financial instruments that they could profit from through speculative positions on carbon prices and the use of brokerage and other financial functions like insurance and derivative instruments.
 Environmental groups: Environmental advocacy groups generally favor strict restrictions on  emissions. Environmental groups, as activists, engage in raising awareness.
 Renewable energy and energy efficiency companies: companies in wind, solar and energy efficiency generally support stricter global warming policies. They expect their share of the energy market to expand as fossil fuels are made more expensive through trading schemes or taxes.
 Nuclear power companies: support and benefit from carbon pricing or subsidies of low-carbon energy production, as nuclear power produces minimal greenhouse gas emissions.
 Electricity distribution companies: may lose from solar panels but benefit from electric vehicles.
 Traditional retailers and marketers: traditional retailers, marketers, and the general corporations respond by adopting policies that resonate with their customers. If "being green" provides customer appeal, then they could undertake modest programs to please and better align with their customers. However, since the general corporation does not make a profit from their particular position, it is unlikely that they would strongly lobby either for or against a stricter global warming policy position.
 Medics: often say that climate change and air pollution can be tackled together and so save millions of lives.
 Information and communications technology companies: say their products help others combat climate change, tend to benefit from reductions in travel, and many purchase green electricity.

The various interested parties sometimes align with one another to reinforce their message, for example electricity companies fund the purchase of electric school buses to benefit medics by reducing the load on the health service whilst at the same time selling more electricity. Sometimes industries will fund specialty nonprofit organizations to raise awareness and lobby on their behest.

Collective action 

Current climate politics are influenced by a number of social and political movements focused on different parts of building political will for climate action. This includes the climate justice movement, youth climate movement and movements to divest from fossil fuel industries.

Divestment movement

Youth movement

Current outlook
Historical political attempts to agree on policies to limit global warming have largely failed. Commentators have expressed optimism that the 2020s can be more successful, due to various recent developments and opportunities that were not present during earlier periods. Other commentators have expressed warnings that there is now very little time to act in order to have any chance of keeping warming below 1.5 °C, or even to have a good chance of keeping global heating under 2 °C.

Opportunities
In the late 2010s, various developments conducive to climate friendly politics saw commentators express optimism that the 2020s might see good progress in addressing the threat of global heating.

Tipping point in public opinion

The year 2019 has been described as "the year the world woke up to climate change", driven by factors such growing recognition of the global warming threat resulting from recent extreme weather events, the Greta effect and the IPPC 1.5 °C report

In 2019, the secretary general of OPEC recognised the school strike movement as the greatest threat faced by the fossil fuel industry. According to Christiana Figueres, once about 3.5% of a population start participating in non violent protest, they are always successful in sparking political change, with the success of Greta Thunberg's Fridays for Future movement suggesting that reaching this threshold may be obtainable.

Reduced influence of climate change denial
By 2019, outright climate change denial had become a much less influential force than it had been in previous years. Reasons for this include the increasing frequency of extreme weather events, more effective communication on the part of climate scientists, and the Greta effect. As an example, in 2019 the Cato Institute closed down its climate shop.

Growth of renewable energy

Renewable energy is an inexhaustible source of naturally replenishing energy. The major renewable energy sources are wind, hydropower, solar, geothermal, and biomass. In 2020, renewable energy generated 29% of world electricity.

In the wake of the Paris Agreement, 168 countries have adopted national renewable energy targets and 115 counties as well, have national renewable energy targets. There are many different efforts used by these countries to help include renewable energy investments such as 102 countries have implemented tax credits, 101 countries include some sort of public investment, and 100 countries currently use tax reductions. The largest  emitters tend to be industrialized countries like the US, China, UK, and India. These countries aren't implementing enough industrial policies (188) compared to deployment policies (more than 1,000). It's clear that these policies must be created in a way where they build upon each other, so they are most effective.

In November 2021, the 26th United Nation Conference of the Parties (COP26) took place in Glasgow, Scotland. Almost 200 nations agreed to accelerate the fight against climate change and commit to more effective climate pledges. Some of the new pledges included reforms on methane gas pollution, deforestation, and coal financing. Surprisingly, the US and China (the two largest carbon emitters) also both agreed to work together on efforts to prevent global warming from surpassing 1.5 degrees Celsius. Some scientists, politicians, and activist are arguing that enough hasn't been done at this summit and that we will still reach that 1.5 degree tipping point. An Independent report by Climate Action Tracker said the commitments were "lip service" and "we will emit roughly twice as much in 2030 as required for 1.5  degrees."

As of 2020, the feasibility of replacing energy from fossil fuel with nuclear and especially renewable energy has much increased, with dozens of countries now generating more than half of their electricity from renewable sources.

Green recovery

Challenges 
Despite various promising conditions, commentators tend to warn that several difficult challenges remain, which need to be overcome if climate change politics is to result in a substantial reduction of greenhouse gas emissions. For example, increasing tax on meat can be politically difficult.

Urgency

As of 2021,  levels have already increased by about 50% since the pre-industrial era, with billions of tons more being released each year. Global warming has already passed the point where it is beginning to have a catastrophic impact in some localities. So major policy changes need to be implemented very soon if the risk of escalating environmental impact is to be avoided.

Centrality of fossil fuel

Energy from fossil fuels remains central to the worlds economy, accounting for about 80% of its energy generation as of 2019. Suddenly removing fossil fuel subsidies from consumers has often been found to cause riots. While clean energy can sometimes be cheaper, provisioning large amounts of renewable energy in a short period of time tends to be challenging. According to a 2023 report by the International Energy Agency, coal emissions grew 243 Mt to a new all-time high of almost 15.5 Gt. This 1.6% increase was faster than the 0.4% annual average growth over the past decade. In 2022 the European Central Bank argued that high energy prices were accelerating the energy transition away from fossil fuel, but that governments should take steps to prevent energy poverty without hindering the move to low carbon energy.

Inactivism
While outright denial of climate change is much less prevalent in the 2020s compared to the preceding decades, many arguments continue to be made against taking action to limit GHG emissions. Such arguments include the view that there are better ways to spend available funds (such as adaptation), that it would be better to wait until new technology is developed as that would make mitigation cheaper, that technology and innovation will render climate change moot or resolve certain aspects, and that the future negative effects of climate change should be heavily discounted compared to current needs.

Fossil fuel lobby and political spending
The largest oil and gas corporations that comprise Big Oil and their industry lobbyist arm, the American Petroleum Institute (API), spend large amounts of money on lobbying and political campaigns, and employ hundreds of lobbyists, to obstruct and delay government action to address climate change. The fossil fuel lobby has considerable clout in Washington, D.C. and in other political centers, including the European Union and the United Kingdom. Fossil fuel industry interests spend many times as much on advancing their agenda in the halls of power than do ordinary citizens and environmental activists, with the former spending $2 billion in the years 2000–2016 on climate change lobbying in the United States. The five largest Big Oil corporations spent hundreds of millions of euros to lobby for its agenda in Brussels.
Big Oil companies often adopt "sustainability principles" that are at odds with the policy agenda their lobbyists advocate, which often entails sewing doubt about the reality and impacts of climate change and forestalling government efforts to address them. API launched a public relations disinformation campaign with the aim of creating doubt in the public mind so that "climate change becomes a non-issue."  This industry also spends lavishly on American political campaigns, with approximately 2/3 of its political contributions over the past several decades fueling Republican Party politicians, and outspending many fold political contributions from renewable energy advocates. Fossil fuel industry political contributions reward politicians who vote against environmental protections. According to a study published by the Proceedings of the National Academy of Sciences of the United States of America, as voting by a member of United States Congress turned more anti-environment, as measured by his/her voting record as scored by the League of Conservation Voters (LCV), the fossil fuel industry contributions that this member of Congress received increased. On average, a 10% decrease in the LCV score was correlated with an increase of $1,700 in campaign contributions from the fossil fuel industry for the campaign following the Congressional term.

Suppression of climate science
Big Oil companies, starting as early as the 1970s, suppressed their own scientists' reports of major climate impacts of the combustion of fossil fuels. ExxonMobil launched a corporate propaganda campaign promoting false information about the issue of climate change, a tactic that has been compared to Big Tobacco's public relations efforts to hoodwink the public about the dangers of smoking. Fossil fuel industry-funded think tanks harassed climate scientists who were publicly discussing the dire threat of climate change. As early as the 1980s when larger segments of the American public began to become aware of the climate change issue, the administrations of some United States presidents scorned scientists who spoke publicly of the threat fossil fuels posed for the climate. Other U.S. administrations have silenced climate scientists and muzzled government whistleblowers. Political appointees at a number of federal agencies prevented scientists from reporting their findings regarding aspects of the climate crisis, changed data modeling to arrive at conclusions they had set out a prior to prove, and shut out the input of career scientists of the agencies.

Targeting of climate activists
Climate and environmental activists, including, increasingly, those defending woodlands against the logging industry, have been killed in several countries, such as Colombia, Brazil and the Philippines. The perpetrators of most such killings have not been punished. A record number of such killings was recorded for the year 2019. Indigenous environmental activists are disproportionately targeted, comprising as many as 40% of fatalities worldwide. Domestic intelligence services of several governments, such as those of the U.S. government, have targeted environmental activists and climate change organizations as "domestic terrorists," surveilling them, investigating them, questioning them, and placing them on national "watchlists" that could make it more difficult for them to board airplanes and could instigate local law enforcement monitoring. Other U.S. tactics have included preventing media coverage of American citizen assemblies and protests against climate change, and partnering with private security companies to monitor activists.

Doomism

In the context of climate change politics, doomism refers to pessimistic narratives that claim that it is now too late to do anything about climate change. Doomism can include exaggeration of the probability of cascading climate tipping points, and their likelihood in triggering runaway global heating beyond human ability to control, even if humanity was able to immediately stop all burning of fossil fuels. In the US, polls found that for people who did not support further action to limit global warming, a belief that it is too late to do so was given as a more common reason than skepticism about man made climate change.

Lack of compromise
Several climate friendly policies have been blocked in the legislative process by environmental and/or left leaning pressure groups and parties. For example, in 2009, the Australian green party voted against the Carbon Pollution Reduction Scheme, as they felt it did not impose a high enough carbon price. In the US, the Sierra Club helped defeat a 2016 climate tax bill which they saw as lacking in social justice. Some of the attempts to impose a carbon price in US states have been blocked by left wing politicians because they were to be implemented by a cap and trade mechanism, rather than a tax.

Multi-sector governance 
The issue of climate change usually fits into various sectors, which means that the integration of climate change policies into other policy areas is frequently called for. Thus the problem is difficult, as it needs to be addressed at multiple scales with diverse actors involved in the complex governance process.

Maladaptation 
Successful adaptation to climate change requires balancing competing economic, social, and political interests. In the absence of such balancing, harmful unintended consequences can undo the benefits of adaptation initiatives. For example, efforts to protect coral reefs in Tanzania forced local villagers to shift from traditional fishing activities to farming that produced higher greenhouse gas emissions.

Technology
The promise of technology is seen as both a threat and a potential boon. New technologies can open up possibilities for new and more effective climate policies. Most models that indicate a path to limiting warming to 2 °C have a big role for carbon dioxide removal, one of the approaches of climate change mitigation. Commentators from across the political spectrum tend to welcome  removal. But some are sceptical that it will be ever be able to remove enough  to slow global warming without there also being rapid cuts in emissions, and they warn that too much optimism about such technology may make it harder for mitigation policies to be enacted.

Solar radiation management is another technology aiming to reduce global warming. At least with the sulphur based aerosol variant, there is broad agreement that it would be effective in bringing down average global temperatures. Yet the prospect is considered unwelcome by many climate scientists. They warn that side effects would include possible reductions in agricultural yields due to reduced sunlight and rainfall, and possible localised temperature rises and other weather disruptions. According to Michael Mann, the prospect of using solar management to reduce temperatures is another argument used to reduce willingness to enact emissions reduction policy.

Just transition

Economic disruption due to phaseout of carbon-intensive activities, such as coal mining, cattle farming or bottom trawling, can be politically sensitive due to the high political profile of coal miners, farmers and fishers in some countries. Many labor and environmental groups advocate for a just transition that minimizes the harm and maximizes the benefits associated with climate-related changes to society, for example by providing job training.

Different responses on the political spectrum

Climate friendly policies are generally supported across the political spectrum. Though there have been many exceptions among voters and politicians leaning towards the right, and even politicians on the left have rarely made addressing climate change a top priority. Some nations and individuals are unwilling to reduce greenhouse gas emissions or enforce laws because in doing so, they would only suffer in paying the full price of abatement. In the 20th century, right wing politicians led much significant action against climate change, both internationally and domestically, with Richard Nixon and Margaret Thatcher being prominent examples. Yet by the 1990s, especially in some English speaking countries and most especially in the US, the issue began to be polarised. Right wing media started arguing that climate change was being invented or at least exaggerated by the left to justify an expansion in the size of government. As of 2020, some right wing governments have enacted increased climate friendly policies. Various surveys indicated a slight trend for even U.S. right wing voters to become less sceptical of global warming, and groups like American Conservation Coalition indicate young Republican voters embrace climate as a central policy field. Though in the view of Anatol Lieven, for some right wing US voters, being sceptical of climate change has become part of their identity, so their position on the matter can not easily be shifted by rational argument.

A 2014 study from the University of Dortmund concluded that countries with centre and left-wing governments had higher emission reductions than right-wing governments in OECD countries for the time period 1992–2008. Historically, nationalist governments have been among the worst performers in enacting policies. Though according to Lieven, as climate change is increasingly seen as a threat to the ongoing existence of nation states, nationalism is likely to become one of the most effective forces to drive determined mitigation efforts. The growing trend to securitize the climate change threat may be especially effective for increasing support among nationalist and conservatives.

Effects of climate change

History

Relationship to climate science

In the scientific literature, there is an overwhelming consensus that global surface temperatures have increased in recent decades and that the trend is caused primarily by human-induced emissions of greenhouse gases.

The politicization of science in the sense of a manipulation of science for political gains is a part of the political process. It is part of the controversies about intelligent design (compare the Wedge strategy) or Merchants of Doubt, scientists that are under suspicion to willingly obscure findings. e.g. about issues like tobacco smoke, ozone depletion, global warming or acid rain. However, e.g. in case of ozone depletion, global regulation based on the Montreal Protocol was successful, in a climate of high uncertainty and against strong resistance while in case of climate change, the Kyoto Protocol failed.

While the IPCC process tries to find and orchestrate the findings of global climate change research to shape a worldwide consensus on the matter it has itself been the object of a strong politicization. Anthropogenic climate change evolved from a mere science issue to a top global policy topic.

The IPCC process having built a broad science consensus does not stop governments following different, if not opposing goals. In case of the ozone depletion challenge, global regulation was already being put into place before a scientific consensus was established. So a linear model of policy-making, based on a the more knowledge we have, the better the political response will be view is not necessarily accurate. Instead knowledge policy, successfully managing knowledge and uncertainties as a foundation for political decision making; requires a better understanding of the relation between science, public (lack of) understanding and policy.

Most of the policy debate concerning climate change mitigation has been framed by projections for the twenty-first century. Academics have criticised this as short term thinking, as decisions made in the next few decades will have environmental consequences that will last for many millennia.

It has been estimated that only 0.12% of all funding for climate-related research is spent on the social science of climate change mitigation. Vastly more funding is spent on natural science studies of climate change and considerable sums are also spent on studies of the impact of and adaptation to climate change. It has been argued that this is a misallocation of resources, as the most urgent puzzle at the current juncture is to work out how to change human behavior to mitigate climate change, whereas the natural science of climate change is already well established and there will be decades and centuries to handle adaptation.

See also 

 Business action on climate change
 Carbon emission trading
 Climate change policy of the United States
 Climate movement
 Clean Development Mechanism
 Climate legislation
 Economics of global warming
 Environmental politics
 Fossil fuel phase-out
 Green New Deal
 Green politics
 List of climate change initiatives
 List of international environmental agreements
 Low-carbon economy

Notes

Citations

References

Further reading
 Naomi Klein (2019). On Fire: The Burning Case for a Green New Deal, Allen Lane, .

External links
 Political Economy of Climate Change

Environmental groups
 Panda—the World Wide Fund for Nature (WWF)
 Greenpeace—Greenpeace
 Stop Climate Chaos —Coalition of UK charities

Business
 Carbon Disclosure Project Carbon Disclosure Project , supported by over 150 institutional investors, aims for transparency on companies' greenhouse gas emissions

.
Environmental terminology
Climate change

Environmental social science
Political economy